The Haifa Theatre (Teat'ron Kheifa) is the first municipal theater company of Haifa, Israel.

Background
Haifa Theater, Israel's first municipal theater, was established by Haifa mayor Abba Hushi. Together with the support of the Haifa City Council.  Founded in 1961, the Haifa Theater employs Jewish and Arab actors, and has an international reputation for performing provocative works. Its first director was Yosef Milo. This theater was the first municipal theater in Israel as well as the first to employ a marketing campaign to promote seasonal tickets. It aims to attract local residents to theatrical creativity and to increase cultural awareness in the city. The Haifa Theater is one that encourages all forms of theatrical productions. It acts as a springboard for Israeli playwrights and producers and encourages original works.

The troupe performs eight to 10 plays a year to a subscription audience of more than 30,000. It performs in cities, kibbutzim and settlements throughout Israel, and regularly presents works of modern theater in Hebrew and Arabic.

The troupe's home base is at the Joseph and Rebecca Meyerhoff Theater of Haifa in Haifa's Hadar Hacarmel neighborhood.

Several producers who have started their professional careers in this theater include Hanoch Levin, Hillel Mittlepunkt, Yehoshua Sobol, A. B. Yehoshua, Joseph Bar Yosef, and  Danny Horowitz.

References

External links
Official website
Haifa Theater controversies, Michael Handelzalts, Haaretz
Haifa Municipal Theater Archive on the Digital collections of Younes and Soraya Nazarian Library, University of Haifa

Israeli culture
Jewish theatres
Theatre companies in Israel
Theatres in Haifa
Tourist attractions in Haifa
Theatres completed in 1961